Duncan Unified School District 2  is a school district in Greenlee County, Arizona.

References

External links
 

School districts in Greenlee County, Arizona